or simply Toppan is a Japanese global printing company. Toppan was founded in 1900 and is headquartered in Tokyo.

History
As of March 2013 the company has 169 subsidiary and affiliate companies. Toppan is listed on the Tokyo Stock Exchange and is a constituent of the Nikkei 225 stock index.

In December 2020 Toppan acquired Taiwanese software company iDGate in order to integrate iDGate's electronic know your customer (eKYC) technology into its identity card business.

Business segments and products

Information and Networks
 Securities and cards: investment security certificates, passbooks, product coupons, gift certificates, lottery tickets, data printing, IC cards
 Commercial printing: posters, catalogs, pamphlets, flyers, direct mailings, calendars, yearbooks, corporate communication tools
 Publications printing: weekly and monthly magazines, books, art books, dictionaries and other reference books, textbooks, electronic publications
 Business forms: RFID and NFC solutions, digital-media related business, integrated slips

Living environment
 Packaging: flexible packaging materials, paper containers, cups, molded plastic products, complex liquid containers, cardboard containers, marketing planning, product planning, development and manufacturing of functional packaging and materials
 Functional products: solar cell backsheets, molded plastic products for electronic devices, materials for recording information, components for secondary batteries
 Interior decor materials: decorative paper/films, wallpaper, flooring materials, interior fixtures, decorative panels

Electronics
 Displays: LCD color filters, anti-reflection films, electromagnetic wave shield mesh for plasma displays
 Semiconductors: photomasks for semiconductors, design services for LSI, device OEM, leadframes, BGA/CSP substrates, color filter arrays for image sensors and small display devices, etched products, printed circuit boards

References

Company Links
  
 Toppan UK & Europe (subsidiary) 
 Toppan Photomasks, Inc 
 Toppan USA, Inc. (supplier of transparent barrier films [GL Films]) 

Companies listed on the Tokyo Stock Exchange
Manufacturing companies based in Tokyo
Engineering companies based in Tokyo
Service companies based in Tokyo
Printing companies of Japan
Electronics companies of Japan
Manufacturing companies established in 1900
Japanese companies established in 1900
Japanese brands